A synod assembly is an event in which nominated representatives of congregations in one of the regional synods of the Evangelical Lutheran Church in America vote on how to run the synod, elect in bishops, and elect representatives to the ELCA's churchwide assembly.

Evangelical Lutheran Church in America